Liu Juanzi Guiyi Fang, also known as Shenxian Yi Lun, is a Chinese medical text allegedly written by the titular Liu Juanzi and published during the Northern and Southern dynasties in 499. The original text comprised ten volumes and is no longer extant; an abridged version by Gong Qingxuan was published sometime in the Song dynasty.

Publication history
According to tradition, Liu Juanzi Guiyi Fang was written in the early 5th century by military physician Liu Juanzi, who had received a yong ju fang ("Recipes for [the Treatment of] Obstruction- and Impediment-Illnesses") from a ghost named Huangfu. First published during the Northern and Southern Dynasties in 499, it is the earliest known Chinese medical text about surgery. The original text comprised ten juan or volumes but is no longer extant, although fragments were unearthed in Xinjiang in 1902. 

Much of the original text was reproduced in later publications such as the Wai tai mi yao fang and the Zheng lei ben cao. Moreover, a surviving abridged version containing five of the original ten volumes was compiled by Gong Qingxuan (550–577) and published sometime in the Song dynasty (960–1279). Almost all of the formulae in the five-volume edition were copied into Sun Simiao's Qianjin yifang.

Contents
The five volumes collected in Gong Qingxuan's revision pertain to the causes and treatment of ulcers and carbuncles as well as the treatment of other maladies such as blood stasis, burns, insomnia, mastitis, rectal prolapse, and scabies.

Notes

References

Citations

Bibliography

 
 
 
 
 
 
 
 

5th-century Chinese books
Chinese medical texts